Touffreville may refer to the following communes in France, in the region Normandy:

Touffreville, Eure, in the Eure département
Touffreville-la-Cable, in the Seine-Maritime département 
Touffreville-la-Corbeline, in the Seine-Maritime département
Touffreville-sur-Eu, in the Seine-Maritime département

See also
Touffréville, in the Calvados département